Mycobacterium diernhoferi is a species of the phylum Actinomycetota (Gram-positive bacteria with high guanine and cytosine content, one of the dominant phyla of all bacteria), belonging to the genus Mycobacterium.

Description
Gram-positive, nonmotile and acid-fast rods (2-6 µm x 0.5 µm).

Colony characteristics
White smooth and non-photochromogenic colonies.

Physiology
Fast growth at 28 °C and 37 °C within 3 days, no growth at 42 °C.
Resistant to isoniazid, rifampin, Susceptible to ethambutol.

Differential characteristics
Belongs to the Mycobacterium parafortuitum complex. Which unifies rapidly growing, scotochromogenic mycobacteria (M. parafortuitum, Mycobacterium aurum, Mycobacterium neoaurum, M. diernhoferi and Mycobacterium austroafricanum).

Pathogenesis
Not associated with disease. Biosafety level 1.

Type strain
First isolated from soil in a cattle field (Germany).
Strain 41001 = ATCC 19340 = CIP 105384 = DSM 43524 = HAMBI 2269 = IFO (now NBRC) 14756 = JCM 6371.

Further reading
Tsukamura et al. 1983. Numerical taxonomy of rapidly growing, scotochromogenic mycobacteria of the Mycobacterium parafortuitum complex: Mycobacterium austroafricanum sp. nov. and Mycobacterium diernhoferi sp. nov., nom. rev. Int. J. Syst. Bacteriol.,33, 460–469.

External links
Type strain of Mycobacterium diernhoferi at BacDive -  the Bacterial Diversity Metadatabase

Acid-fast bacilli
diernhoferi
Bacteria described in 1983